Joshua Jobe (born April 9, 1998) is an American football cornerback for the Philadelphia Eagles of the National Football League (NFL). He played college football at Alabama, winning a national championship in 2020.

Early life and high school
Jobe grew up in Miami, Florida and attended Christopher Columbus High School. He was rated a four star recruit and initially committed to play college football at the University of Miami. Jobe transferred to Cheshire Academy in Cheshire, Connecticut before his senior year due being ruled too old to play high school in Florida. Jobe also re-opened his recruitment and ultimately flipped his commitment to Alabama in December 2017.

College career
Jobe played in 14 games as a reserve defensive back as a true freshman, making eight total tackles. He played in 12 games with two starts, one of which was the 2020 Citrus Bowl, in his sophomore season and recorded 28 tackles, one interception and three passes broken up. Jobe was named a starter at cornerback going into his junior season.

College statistics

Professional career

After going unselected in the 2022 NFL Draft, Jobe was signed by the Philadelphia Eagles as an undrafted free agent on April 30. He was one of three 2022 undrafted players to make the Eagles' final roster, along with Josh Sills and Reed Blankenship.

References

External links
 Philadelphia Eagles bio
Alabama Crimson Tide bio

1998 births
Living people
Players of American football from Miami
American football cornerbacks
Alabama Crimson Tide football players
Christopher Columbus High School (Miami-Dade County, Florida) alumni
Cheshire Academy alumni
Philadelphia Eagles players